Leonardo Godoy (born 28 April 1995) is an Argentine footballer who plays as a defender for Estudiantes de La Plata.

References

External links

1995 births
Living people
Association football defenders
Argentine footballers
Talleres de Córdoba footballers
Atlético de Rafaela footballers
Estudiantes de La Plata footballers
Argentine Primera División players
People from Concordia, Entre Ríos
Sportspeople from Entre Ríos Province